Servants to Asia’s Urban Poor is an international network of Christian communities living and working in the slums of Asia and the West, participating with the poor to bring hope and justice through Jesus Christ. Servants is an organic movement, body, family and community, rather than a traditional mission organization, charity, or NGO. 

Servants was established by Viv Grigg, a missionary working in Manila. Over twenty-five years ago he became the first missionary in Manila to choose to live in a slum, renting a room in the squatter settlement of Tatalon. Now Servants has teams in the Philippines, Cambodia, the UK, Indonesia, Burma, Canada and two Indian cities. Servants also has sending offices in North America, Australia, New Zealand, Switzerland, the UK and the Philippines. 

Servants seeks to build partnerships and networks with individuals, churches, NGOs, government agencies and missions who share a similar concern for the urban poor. Servants approaches this with sensitivity, listening and learning where God is already at work in people's lives and communities, and then joining him in that work. Because Servants live and work with the poor, they have a deeper understanding of the local language and culture. Servants recognizes that the poor have resources of their own (such as ideas, skills, and energies) to contribute to transformation, and that true sustainable transformation will only come when these resources have been mobilized. Rather than building an institution, Servants aims to raise up local disciples and leaders to equip the body of Christ.

Five Principles & Five Values 

Servants adheres to five principles and five values. The principles are: 

Incarnation - Servants choose to intentionally live among the urban poor, sharing life with them, learning from them, and building relationships with them. They seek to discern the best way to live out Jesus love in that context.

Community - Servants work in teams that model the supportive love, care, and community demonstrated by Jesus' live. They work "with the people, not for them."

Wholism - Servants aspire to see the good news of Jesus proclaimed in word, deed and power.
"We have a God who is working to renew all things and to restore wholeness of life to individuals and communities, rich and poor alike. We work for justice, proclaim God’s grace, and lift all things to Him in prayer." 

Servanthood - Servants seek to follow Jesus who came in humility ‘not to be served but to serve.’
"We empower the poor by placing control in their hands and not overpowering them with outside resources or expertise. With courage, we embrace sacrifice and suffering,  share faithfully in the life of Jesus and the poor."

Simple Lifestyle - Servants commit to simplicity of life to be free to love and serve God and the poor.
"Setting aside our ‘right’ to affluence while there are still those who live in abject poverty, we desire to be a relevant yet prophetic voice in a world preoccupied with self." 

Servants are sustained by five values:

Grace

"All that we do and are is rooted and sustained by God’s lavish, unearned love, favour and forgiveness towards us. This profound grace delivers us from unhealthy striving, competition and condemnation of ourselves or judgment of others."

Celebration

"Directing our celebrations to God in worship, we look for excuses to throw parties, consciously marking every milestone and achievement – no matter how small! We want to be people of generosity, who refuse to take ourselves too seriously." 

Beauty

"In our lives, in our homes, in our communities and in our world, we honour God and renew our souls by recognising and creating beauty. In particular, we want to see and celebrate the beauty inherent in ourselves and in each other."

Creativity

"By allowing our senses, our imaginations, our minds and bodies to fulfil their God-given potentials for creativity, we glorify God. We believe it does our souls good (and pleases God) when we create, through writing and storytelling, poetry, cooking, music, painting and other art forms."

Rest

"God calls us to regular rhythms of work, rest and reflection – weekly Sabbaths and regular holy-days (holidays). We seek to obey God’s command to rest to be refreshed, to be still and to deepen our relationship with him and one another."

Similar Christian Movements 
New Friars
New Monasticism-related communities
Catholic Worker Movement
Madonna House Apostolate

See also 
Missionaries of Charity, Mother Teresa of Calcutta's community serving the poorest of the poor throughout the world.

References 
Servants official website retrieved Feb. 20, 2014

Christian missionary societies
Nondenominational Christian societies and communities
Christian missions in Asia